The U.S. Snowboarding Grand Prix was created in 1996 by U.S. Snowboarding with snowboarding progression as a top priority. This annual competition series utilizes top resorts from across the United States to host world-class snowboarding competitions which draw the best male and female riders in the world. It was the first domestic competition series to offer equal prize money to male and female competitors and is now the official qualifying series for making the U.S. Olympic Team for halfpipe.

The Series

The Sprint U.S. Snowboarding Grand Prix is considered the premier snowboard competition series in the United States, providing American riders a clear path to qualifying for the Olympics and progressing the sport.

It's tops on the list for riders and attracts the best of snowboarding from all over the country. Previous overall champions include Olympic gold medalists Hannah Teter, Kelly Clark, Shaun White and Ross Powers, as well as Olympic silver medalist Gretchen Bleiler.

With a $375,000 overall purse, it is one of the largest prizes for a snowboarding series. Over the span of the Grand Prix's lifetime, more than $4 million has been awarded to riders.

Every series stop is broadcast on NBC and NBC Sports Network.

The schedule for the 2013–14 season has not yet been announced but will include stops at Park City Mountain Resort, Mammoth Mountain, Northstar California and Copper Mountain (Colorado).

Past Overall Champions

External links
Sprint U.S. Snowboarding Grand Prix official site
U.S. Snowboarding official site
U.S. Ski & Snowboard Association official site

Snowboarding competitions
Snowboarding in the United States